Richard Oren "Dick" Klemm (May 5, 1932 – March 22, 2010) was an American businessman and politician.

Born in Chicago, Illinois, Klemm served in the United States Army from 1957 to 1962. He received his bachelor's degree in industrial economics and engineering from Purdue University. Klemm owned the Food Warming Equipment Company. He lived in Crystal Lake, Illinois. He served on the Prairie Grove School District 46 school board and was president of the school board. Klemm also served on the McHenry County, Illinois Board of Commissioners and was a Republican. From 1983 to 1993, Klemm served in the Illinois House of Representatives and then served in the Illinois Senate from 1993 until his retirement in 2003. Klemm died at Centegra Hospital in Woodstock, Illinois.

Notes

External links

1932 births
2010 deaths
Politicians from Chicago
People from Crystal Lake, Illinois
Military personnel from Illinois
Purdue University College of Engineering alumni
Businesspeople from Illinois
County board members in Illinois
School board members in Illinois
Members of the Illinois House of Representatives
Illinois state senators
20th-century American businesspeople